Prostitution (German: Die Prostitution) is a 1919 German silent drama film directed by Richard Oswald and starring Conrad Veidt, Reinhold Schünzel and Gussy Holl. It was released in two parts Das gelbe Haus and Die sich verkaufen. It was one of several enlightenment films made during the era by Oswald. The physician Magnus Hirschfeld was an advisor on the production. The first part premiered at the Marmorhaus in Berlin.

Cast

Part I
 Fritz Beckmann as Klaßen, Agent 
 Anita Berber as Lola, dessen Tochter 
 Gussy Holl as Hedwig 
 Conrad Veidt as Alfred Werner 
 Rudolf Klein-Rhoden as Hiller, Hausbesitzer 
 Rita Clermont as Vera, Hillers Tochter 
 Reinhold Schünzel as Karl Döring 
 Ferdinand Bonn as Michalsky 
 Marga Köhler as Madame Riedel 
 Kissa von Sievers as Die Prostitution 
 Preben J. Rist as Diener der Gerechtigkeit 
 Emil Lind as alter Herr 
 Werner Krauss as Mann 
 Ernst Gronau
 Wilhelm Diegelmann

Part II
 Conrad Veidt 
 Reinhold Schünzel
 Gertrude Hoffman
 Eduard von Winterstein
 Ilka Grüning
 Preben J. Rist
 Paul Morgan
 Kissa von Sievers
 Gussy Holl

References

Bibliography
 Soister, John T. Conrad Veidt on Screen: A Comprehensive Illustrated Filmography. McFarland, 2002.
 Rogowski, Christian. The Many Faces of Weimar Cinema: Rediscovering Germany's Filmic Legacy. Camden House, 2010.

External links

1919 films
Films of the Weimar Republic
German silent feature films
Films directed by Richard Oswald
German drama films
1919 drama films
German black-and-white films
Films about prostitution in Germany
Silent drama films
1910s German films
1910s German-language films